is a Japanese professional baseball player for the Saitama Seibu Lions of Nippon Professional Baseball(NPB). He previously played for the Yomiuri Giants.

Career
In , Orix BlueWave selected him with the first selection, but he did not sign, and he joined Tokyo Gas in the Japanese industrial leagues from 2000 to 2003.

In , Yomiuri Giants selected him and joined.

On December 20, 2018, he was sent to Saitama Seibu Lions as the human compensation from the earlier transferred for Ginjiro Sumitani.

International career
He was selected Japan national baseball team at the 2009 World Baseball Classic and 2013 World Baseball Classic.

And also, in a 2008 preseason exhibition game against the Boston Red Sox, Utsumi struck out 4 out of the 6 Red Sox batters he faced.

Pitching style
Utsumi is a "junkball" pitcher, meaning that he does not have overpowering pitches.  His fastball is usually in the 140 km/h (87 MPH) range, and he complements it with a slurve, a changeup, and a forkball.  Utsumi relies on his control to get batters out, and it is usually pretty good, but when Utsumi misses his spots, that is when trouble finds him, usually in the form of home runs.

References

External links

Living people
1982 births
Japanese baseball players
Nippon Professional Baseball pitchers
Saitama Seibu Lions players
Baseball people from Kyoto Prefecture
Yomiuri Giants players
2009 World Baseball Classic players
2013 World Baseball Classic players
Japanese baseball coaches
Nippon Professional Baseball coaches